Per "Pelle" Olsson (born 1 August 1963) is a Swedish football manager in charge of Sandvikens IF. He started out playing for his hometown club Skutskärs IF. During his injury-filled playing career he also represented Gefle IF, Malmö FF, Halmstads BK and the Sweden national under-21 football team. In his managerial career he is influenced by the managers who he previously played for like Roy Hodgson, Stuart Baxter and Benny Lennartsson. Before the start of the 2012 Allsvenskan season he was named the best manager in the league by newspaper Aftonbladet due to his ability to build a low-budget team that is greater than its individual parts.

References

1963 births
Living people
Swedish footballers
Swedish football managers
Gefle IF managers
Djurgårdens IF Fotboll managers
Örebro SK non-playing staff
Gefle IF players
Malmö FF players
Halmstads BK players
AFC Eskilstuna managers
Allsvenskan players
Sweden under-21 international footballers

Association football forwards